Spyros Defteraios (10 October 1919 – 29 December 1998) was a Greek wrestler. who competed at the 1948 and 1956 Summer Olympics.

References

External links
 

1919 births
1998 deaths
Greek male sport wrestlers
Olympic wrestlers of Greece
Wrestlers at the 1948 Summer Olympics
Wrestlers at the 1956 Summer Olympics
Place of birth missing
20th-century Greek people